1,2-Dimethoxybenzene, commonly known as veratrole, is an organic compound with the formula CH(OCH). It is one of three isomers of dimethoxybenzene. It is a colorless liquid, with a pleasant odor and slight solubility in water.  It is the dimethyl ether derived from pyrocatechol.

Occurrence
1,2-Dimethoxybenzene is naturally occurring. Its biosynthesis entails the methylation of guaiacol by guaiacol O-methyltransferase.   1,2-Dimethoxybenzene is an insect attractant. Guaiacol O-methyltransferase gene is first scent gene discovered so far in any plant species.

Uses 
1,2-Dimethoxybenzene is a building block for the organic synthesis of other aromatic compounds.  Veratrole is relatively electron-rich and thus readily undergoes electrophilic substitution.

An example of the use of veratrole is in the synthesis of Domipizone.

Veratrole can easily be brominated with NBS to give 4-bromoveratrole.

Related compounds 
 1,3-Dimethoxybenzene
 1,4-Dimethoxybenzene
 Methyl isoeugenol

References 

O-methylated natural phenols